Acanthogonatus patagallina is a mygalomorph spider of Chile, named after its type locality: Pata de Gallina, Arauco, Region VIII (Bío Bío Region). This species is closest to A. nahuelbuta, but is distinguished by having the basal portion of the male's bulbal duct more sinuous and the basal portion of its bulb more rounded in lateral view.

Description
Male: total length ; cephalothorax length , width ; cephalic region length , width ; medial ocular quadrangle (OQ) length , width ; labium length , width ; sternum length , width . Its labium possesses no cuspules; its maxillae have 15 attenuate setae. A well-developed serrula is present. Its sternal sigilla is small, almost rounded and shallow. Chelicerae: rastellum is absent. Cheliceral tumescence is small and ventrally produced. Leg I and its tibial apophysis is similar to that of A. Nahuelbuta, while its metatarsus is straight. Its cephalothorax and legs are a reddish-brown colour, with yellowish lighter glabrous leg stripes. Its sternum is yellowish, and its dorsal abdomen is densely mottled.

Distribution
Only in its type locality.

References

External links

 ADW entry

Pycnothelidae
Spiders of South America
Spiders described in 1995
Endemic fauna of Chile